Anomaly Detection at Multiple Scales, or ADAMS, was a $35 million DARPA project designed to identify patterns and anomalies in very large data sets. It is under DARPA's Information Innovation office and began in 2011 and ended in August 2014

The project was intended to detect and prevent insider threats such as "a soldier in good mental health becoming homicidal or
suicidal", an "innocent insider becoming malicious", or "a government employee [who] abuses access privileges to share classified information". Specific cases mentioned are Nidal Malik Hasan and WikiLeaks source Chelsea Manning. Commercial applications may include finance. The intended recipients of the system output are operators in the counterintelligence agencies.

The Proactive Discovery of Insider Threats Using Graph Analysis and Learning was part of the ADAMS project. The Georgia Tech team includes noted high-performance computing researcher David A. Bader.

See also 
 Cyber Insider Threat
 Einstein (US-CERT program)
 Threat (computer)
 Intrusion detection

References 

Applied data mining
Computer security
Georgia Tech Research Institute
DARPA projects